Alli Arjuna is 2002 Indian Tamil-language drama film directed by Saran. The film stars Manoj Bharathiraja and Richa Pallod, while Preetha Vijayakumar, Karan, Dhamu, Charle, Vinu Chakravarthy and Jai Ganesh play supporting roles. The music was composed by A. R. Rahman with cinematography by A. Venkatesh and editing by Suresh Urs. The film released on 14 January 2002.

Plot
Arivazhagan (Manoj Bharathiraja) is from Chennai and has grown up to be a good-for-nothing fellow because of the neglect and ill-treatment by the hands of his rich parents (Jai Ganesh and Fathima Babu). Despite being a border-mark graduate, his only aim in life is to be an irritant to his father. The entire family goes to Bangalore to attend the marriage of Savitri (Richa Pallod) in Bangalore, and when the groom disappears, Arivu offers to take his place. The families agree and Arivu waits for Savitri on the wedding stage. But Savitri also elopes, and Arivu feels betrayed. Months later, Savitri shows up at Arivu's house later, asking him to give her refuge. When he moves out of the house to take up residence with his friends, she follows him there too. Initially irritated by her, Arivu realises that he is gradually falling in love with her.

Meanwhile, the friends learn more about Savitri's wedding. A year before the wedding Nisha, (Preetha Vijayakumar) an accountant in Chennai, reveals to her friend Savitri that she asks for help to arrange her wedding. Savitri convinces Nisha's brother Kishore (Karan) and Nisha's wedding is hastily arranged. But two days before the wedding, Nisha becomes a victim of sexual assault. She comes home and out of shame commits suicide by immolation. Nisha's mother tries to save her and gets severely burned. Nisha's brother Kishore (Karan), starts to fervently search for the molester. When Savitri was recovering from the loss of her friend, Kumar's family came to propose to her. Savitri decided to teach him a lesson, and blackmailed him at the last moment to leave his own wedding.

One day, Arivu lands up in Kishore's house when he follows Savitri, and he is shocked to know that Nisha is Kishore's deceased sister. The reason he became shocked is he was responsible for her death and cries in an outburst. However, Kishore does not know this, and he advises Arivu to succeed in his love towards Savitri. He send drops Arivu, but Arivu's former enemy Kumar (Mahanadhi Shankar) tells Kishore that he sexually assaulted his sister. Hence, Kishore chases Arivu and beats him mercilessly with rage. Just as Kishore is about to kill Arivu in the same way that his sister died i.e immolation, Savitri and her parents intervene the fight, and Arivu is forgiven and saved. The film hence ends with a sad note as Arivu is not united with Savitri and walks out.

Cast

 Manoj Bharathiraja as Arivazhagan (Arivu)
 Richa Pallod as Savithri (Saavi)
 Preetha Vijayakumar as Nisha
 Vinu Chakravarthy as D. A. Dinakaran (Daddy)
 Nizhalgal Ravi as Savithri's father
 Jai Ganesh as Anbu, Arivazhagan's father
 Karan as Kishore
 Charle as Oomadurai
 Dhamu as Kamatchi
 Vaiyapuri as Meenatchi
 Thyagu as Illicit arrack seller
 Ramji as Natraj
 Santhana Bharathi as House owner
 Shyam Ganesh as Raja
 Nair Raman as Nisha's grandfather
 Mahanadi Shankar as Paan Kumar
 Anjathe Sridhar as Paan Kumar's henchman
 Ambika as Savithri's mother
 Jyothi as Kishore's mother
 Fathima Babu as Usha, Arivazhagan's mother
 Uma Maheshwari as Ilavarasi, Arivazhagan's sister
 Vanaja as Tamilarasi, Arivazhagan's sister
 Sivanarayanamoorthy as Police inspector
 Vindhya in a special appearance

Soundtrack

The soundtrack of the movie was composed by A. R. Rahman. The lyrics are done by Vairamuthu and Arivumathi. 4 songs are re-used from Rahman's earlier Hindi films: Pukar, 1947 Earth and One 2 Ka 4. The soundtrack was released in 2002.

References

External links

2002 films
2000s Tamil-language films
Films scored by A. R. Rahman
Films directed by Saran
Films about sexual harassment